When the Night is the debut studio album by New York City-based musician St. Lucia. It was released on October 8, 2013 through Neon Gold Records and Columbia Records. The album has charted in the United States.

Background
The original version of "Call Me Up" was recorded in the bathroom of a Tommy Bahama in Florida. Grobler explained during a performance in Boston that he was self-conscious about the way the words sounded in the song, "They always sound kind of mumbly." However, he said that he "realized it's a tender love song in a way, and that I wanted the lyrics to feel that way because it almost feels like when you’re whispering words into your lover's ear or something."

Promotion
In December 2012, a music video for "September" was released. It was directed by Francis. The song appeared in the soundtrack for EA Sports football video game, FIFA 13.

A music video for "Elevate", directed by NORTON, was released on September 19, 2013.

The song "Elevate" appears in the soundtrack for Konami football video game PES 2016.

Track listing

Personnel

Credits adapted from AllMusic

Musicians
St. Lucia (Jean-Philip Grobler) – vocals
Jonas Raabe – keyboards
Ross Clark – guitar, bass guitar
Nicholas Paul - keyboards, piano
Garrett Ienner – guitar
Patricia Beranek – keyboards, percussion, vocals
Nick Brown – drums
Chris Zane – drums
Sonny Ratcliff – drums
Drew Cappotto – percussion
Alan Ferber – trombone
Ari Bragi Kárason – trumpet
Nathan Koci – French Horn
Mike Ruby – saxophone
Tim Sullivan – saxophone

Technical personnel
Jean-Philip Grobler – engineering, production
Jonas Raabe – production
Chris Zane – engineering, mixing, additional production
Andy Baldwin – drum engineering, mixing
Sonny Ratcliff – drum engineering
Benjamin Gebert – engineering, percussion engineering
Rich Costey – mixing
Greg Calbi – mastering
James Iha – executive production
Chris Kasych – Pro-Tools

Additional personnel
Derek Davies – A&R
Carson Donnelly – A&R
Andrew Keller – A&R
Lizzy Plapinger – A&R
Jeff Gilligan – art direction, design
Leif Podhajsky – cover design, illustrations
Bo Hill – assistant

Charts

Release history

References

2013 debut albums
St. Lucia (musician) albums